Alicia María Boscatto (born June 16, 1960) is a retired breaststroke swimmer from Argentina, who won the silver medal in the women's 200m Breaststroke event at the 1987 Pan American Games. She represented her native country at two consecutive Summer Olympics, starting in 1984 in Los Angeles, California.

References
 

1960 births
Living people
Argentine female breaststroke swimmers
Argentine female swimmers
Swimmers at the 1979 Pan American Games
Swimmers at the 1983 Pan American Games
Swimmers at the 1984 Summer Olympics
Swimmers at the 1987 Pan American Games
Swimmers at the 1988 Summer Olympics
Olympic swimmers of Argentina
Pan American Games silver medalists for Argentina
Pan American Games medalists in swimming
Medalists at the 1987 Pan American Games
20th-century Argentine women